Notable Slovak football transfers in the summer transfer window 2018 by club. Only transfers of the Fortuna Liga is included.

Fortuna Liga

FC Spartak Trnava

In:

Out:

ŠK Slovan Bratislava

In:

Out:

FC DAC 1904 Dunajská Streda

In:

Out:

MŠK Žilina

In:

Out:

AS Trenčín

In:

Out:

MFK Ružomberok

In:

Out:

FC Nitra

In:

Out:

MFK Zemplín Michalovce

In:

Out:

FK Železiarne Podbrezová

In:

Out:

FC ViOn Zlaté Moravce

In:

Out:

FK Senica

In:

Out:

ŠKF Sereď

In:

Out:

References

Transfers
Slovakia
2018